Dumbarton Castle has the longest recorded history of any stronghold in Scotland.

History
Dumbarton Rock was formed between 330 and 340 million years ago, during the Early Carboniferous period, a time of widespread volcanic activity in the area where Glasgow is now situated; over time, the softer exterior of the volcano weathered away, leaving behind a volcanic plug of basalt.

Iron Age
At least as far back as the Iron Age, this has been the site of a strategically important settlement, as evidenced by archaeological finds.

The people that came to reside there in the era of Roman Britain were known to have traded with the Romans. However the first written record about a settlement there was in a letter that Saint Patrick wrote to King Ceretic of Alt Clut in the late 5th century.

Early Medieval era
David Nash Ford has proposed that Dumbarton was the Cair Brithon ("Fort of the Britons") listed by Nennius among the 28 cities of Sub-Roman Britain. From the 5th century until the 9th, the castle was the centre of the independent Brythonic Kingdom of Strathclyde. Alt Clut or Alcluith ("Rock of the Clyde"), the Brythonic name for Dumbarton Rock, became a metonym for kingdom. The king of Dumbarton in about AD 570 was Riderch Hael, who features in Welsh and Latin works.

Merlin was said to have stayed at Alt Clut. The medieval Scalacronica of Sir Thomas Grey recorded the legend that says that "Arthur left Hoël of Brittany his nephew sick at Alcluit in Scotland." Hoël made a full recovery, but was besieged in the castle by the Scots and Picts. The story first appeared in Geoffrey of Monmouth's Historia Regum Britanniae. Amongst lists of three things, in the triads of the Red Book of Hergest, the third "Unrestrained Ravaging" was Aeddan Fradog (the Wily, perhaps Áedán mac Gabráin), coming to the court of Rhydderch the Generous at Alclud, who left neither food nor drink nor beast alive. This battle also appears in stories of Myrddin Wyllt, the Merlin of Geoffrey of Monmouth's Vita Merlini, perhaps conflated with the battle of Arfderydd, located as Arthuret by some authors.

In 756, the first (and second) losses of Dumbarton Rock were recorded. A joint force of Picts and Northumbrians captured the fortress after a siege, only to lose it again a few days later. By 870, it was home to a tightly packed British settlement, which served as a fortress and as the capital of Alt Clut. In 871, the Irish-based Viking kings Amlaíb Conung and Ímar laid siege to Dumbarton Rock. The fortress fell in four months, after its water supply failed. The kings are recorded to have returned to Ireland with 200 ships and a host of British, English, and Pictish captives. These prisoners may have included the ruling family of Alt Clut including the king Arthgal ap Dyfnwal, who was slain the following year under uncertain circumstances. Following the Viking destruction of the fortress, Dumbarton Rock does not appear on record again until the 13th century, and the capital of the restructured Kingdom of Strathclyde appears to have relocated up the Clyde to the vicinity of Partick and Govan.

Medieval era

In medieval Scotland, Dumbarton (Dùn Breatainn, which means "the fortress of the Britons") was an important royal castle. It is believed to be the place Sir John Menteith took William Wallace on the way to London after Wallace's capture. It sheltered David II and his young wife, Joan of The Tower after the Scottish defeat at Halidon Hill in 1333.

In 1425 the castle was attacked by James the Fat, youngest son of Murdoch Stewart, Duke of Albany, who had been imprisoned by King James I of Scotland on charges of treason. James the Fat became a rallying point for enemies of the King, and raised a rebellion against the crown. He marched on the town of Dumbarton and burned it, but was unable to take the castle, whose defender John Colquhoun successfully held out against James' men.

James IV and Dumbarton
The former supporters of James III under the leadership of John Stewart, 1st Earl of Lennox met up at Dumbarton Castle in October 1489. They had hoped to gain the support of Henry VII of England. James IV defeated them in a battle between the Touch and Menteith hills near Stirling on 11 and 12 October. James IV used Dumbarton as the west coast base for his navy and campaigns to subdue the Western Isles. James was at Dumbarton with the Chancellor of Scotland, Colin Campbell, 1st Earl of Argyll, in November 1489. He had the use of a ship belonging to the Laird of Luss. In the following February a royal ship was 'chaysit' by the English and lost some of her cables. In 1494 a row barge was built at Dumbarton for the king using timber from Loch Lomond.

In March 1495 James IV was provided with a camp bed for use at sea and a boat carried cannon to Dumbarton. Patrick Hepburn, 1st Earl of Bothwell, was made Captain of the castle on 1 April 1495. A man played on the clarschaw, a Gaelic harp, for the King. In 1505 Dumbarton was the King's base for visiting the Western Isles. One ship's mast was made from timber from Drymen. On 5 June James was entertained by a French 'quhissilar', perhaps playing a recorder and on 8 June James played cards with John Murray and Master Robert Cockburn losing £4 and 10 shillings, and later that day attended Evensong in the Parish kirk and College of Dumbarton. In 1505 John Ramsay built a ship for the King called the Columb (Saint Columba being the father of Christianity in Scotland). In December 1505 a sword that had belonged to William Wallace was repaired.

Regent Albany, James V and the circumnavigation of Scotland
On 18 May 1515 the James or the Margaret with six other ships brought John Stewart, Regent Albany to Dumbarton. These royal ships were repaired at Dumbarton in July and new docks were made for them. John Drummond of Milnab brought fourteen of their guns to Glasgow. In September Regent Albany held court at Dumbarton, and received Thomas Benolt, the English Clarenceux King of Arms. The Carrick Herald and Clarenceux were sent to Lord Maxwell. In March 1516 Albany issued six letters of remission (forgiveness) to those who had held the castle for Lennox against the king in 1489. Regent Albany returned to France from Dumbarton in 1524.

In 1526 John Stewart, 3rd Earl of Lennox fortified Dumbarton against the Douglas faction who had control of the young James V, but his forces were defeated by Archibald Douglas, 6th Earl of Angus at the battle of Linlithgow Bridge. James Hamilton of Finnart, who was implicated in the death of the Earl of Lennox, was given custody of the castle till 1531. Later in his personal reign James V used the castle as a prison for those convicted at the justice ayre, receiving their fines and composition payments in 1539. In 1540 James circumnavigated Scotland from the Forth and arrived at Dumbarton with Cardinal Beaton, the Earl of Huntly, and the Earl of Arran each leading a force of five hundred men. This expedition was later published by Nicolas de Nicolay Seigneur d'Arfeville, cosmographer to the King of France in 1583, with the first modern map of Scotland's coastline.

Lennox and Mary, Queen of Scots
Matthew, Earl of Lennox had been an ally of the French party in Scotland led by Mary of Guise but committed himself to the pro-English faction. In 1544 munitions and ten thousand French crowns of the sun arrived with Jacques de la Brosse at Dumbarton's harbour and were secured by Lennox and the Earl of Glencairn. Lennox then went into England, leaving the castle in the keeping of William Stirling of Glorat. Lennox signed a deal with Henry VIII of England offering Dumbarton Castle and the Isle of Bute in return for land in England and marriage to Henry's niece Margaret Douglas, and the future Governorship of Scotland if circumstances permitted. Lennox undertook to prevent the infant queen Mary being taken from Scotland. However, George Stirling of Glorat, unhappy at this policy, prevented Lennox returning into the castle and he was forced to sail to Ireland. George Stirling declared that he would hold the castle in the name of the young queen only. The Privy Council of Scotland agreed to George Stirling's plan. Despite this, more French troops landed at Dumbarton under the leadership of Lorges Montgomery, the soldier who later killed Henry II of France at a joust in 1559.

In May 1545 Lennox tried to take the castle, with soldiers commanded by his brother, Robert Stewart, Bishop of Caithness. He sailed from Chester with around 20 followers in May 1546 in the Katherine Goodman and a pinnace. Regent Arran besieged the castle with a superior force, having borrowed the artillery of the Earl of Argyle and ordering Robert Hamilton of Briggis to bring guns from Dunbar. George Stirling of Glorat surrendered after 20 days and made terms. The chronicle historian John Lesley wrote that the Captain and the Bishop surrendered the castle to Arran and were rewarded, after negotiation by the Earl of Huntly. The siege at Dumbarton delayed Arran's action at the siege of St Andrews Castle on the East coast of Scotland.  

Thereafter the castle was in the hands of Regent Arran and he held court in person there in July giving legal remission to the keeper of the Castle and in March 1547 acknowledging the good service of George Stirling of Glorat in rendering the castle to him.

As the war of the Rough Wooing continued, Mary, Queen of Scots was lodged in the castle by 22 February 1548. Alexander Cunningham, 5th Earl of Glencairn wrote to Mary of Guise from Dumbarton that he had received a French cargo, and it would be as safe as if it were in Stirling Castle. The English commander Grey of Wilton proposed basing warships at Lamlash on Arran as a convenient base to watch for French ships coming for Mary.

Mary of Guise was at the castle in the first days of May 1548 and Mary, Queen of Scots was kept at the castle for several months before her embarkation for France for safety on 13 July 1548. The sailing however was delayed by adverse winds till 7 August 1548. Her party including her governess Lady Fleming and the Four Marys left the Clyde in a fleet under the command of Nicolas de Villegagnon. They sailed around the west coast of Ireland, to avoid English ships commanded by Edward Clinton. In France she was soon betrothed to the young dauphin Francis.

Regent Arran made Andrew Hamilton captain and keeper of Dumbarton. In 1557, there was war between England and Scotland again. According to a rumour heard by Gilbert Kennedy, 3rd Earl of Cassilis, five hundred Gascon soldiers arrived at Dumbarton destined to serve on the borders against the English for Mary of Guise.

Marian Civil War, Regent Morton, and the Duke of Lennox
Mary, Queen of Scots stayed at Dumbarton Castle in July 1563. After the defeat at the Battle of Langside in 1568 she tried to reach the Castle, but went instead to England. John Fleming, 5th Lord Fleming, keeper of the Castle went with her into England and was allowed to return. When William Kirkcaldy of Grange governor of Edinburgh Castle changed sides to support Mary, this became a problem for Regent Moray. The subsequent conflict is known as the Marian Civil War.

The first siege of Dumbarton was lifted because of the assassination of Regent Moray in January 1570. The assassin James Hamilton of Bothwellhaugh was welcomed at Dumbarton. Fleming's defence of Dumbarton for Mary was satirized in a ballad printed by Robert Lekprevik in May 1570; The tressoun of Dumbertane. Attributed to Robert Sempill, the ballad describes Fleming's failed ambush of Sir William Drury in May 1570. In October 1570 during the Marian civil war the castle was fortified for Mary against the supporters of James VI of Scotland with stones obtained by demolishing churches and houses in Dumbarton and Cardross. The castle was captured by the forces of Regent Lennox led by Thomas Crawford of Jordanhill and John Cunningham of Drumquhassle in the early hours of 2 April 1571, who used ladders to scale the rock and surprise the garrison.

Dumbarton Castle was used as prison for Regent Morton in June 1581 before his execution in Edinburgh. On 8 September 1582 the castle was put unto the keeping of William Stewart of Caverston an ally of Esmé Stewart, 1st Duke of Lennox, the King's favourite. The Duke of Lennox was displaced by the Gowrie Regime and went to the castle in secret pretending to be travelling from Edinburgh to nearby Dalkeith Palace. Lennox had his own ship there described as a barque. Robert Bowes, the English resident agent, expected the Duke of Lennox would sail to France from Dumbarton "having well victualled his shippe there." Other observers were anxious that the castle might become a foothold for French forces in Scotland allied to Lennox and his faction. In December 1582 two Englishmen in Lennox's service at Dumbarton left by his ship from Largs. Lennox himself travelled to France through England, never to return.

James VI came to Dunbarton during his progress and ate dinner in the castle on 24 August 1598.

Seventeenth century
Although few buildings remain from this period there are records of works in 1617, 1618, and 1628–9. A replacement Wallace Tower was built superseding the medieval building. In June 1618 masons were working on the upper storey and it was decided to make the tower larger. Externally it was finished with lime plaster called harling. At the south side there was a bell house. By 1627 it was discovered that the keeper Sir John Stewart of Methven had neglected the fortress. He was replaced by Sir John Stewart of Traquair who recorded the poor state of the building. Surviving accounts mostly record work on the artillery and the 'foir yet wall' a defence on the southern side. The Scottish Parliament in 1644 judged that the castle was likely to more hurtful than useful to the country.

In November 1645 the Committee of Estates approved the recruitment of thirty extra soldiers by the keeper John Semple to guard the increased number of prisoners. The castle's strategic importance declined after Oliver Cromwell's death in 1658. However, due to threats posed by Jacobites and the French in the eighteenth century, new structures and defences were built and the castle was garrisoned until World War II. Some documentation for these later works is preserved in the National Archives of Scotland.

Inventories
Several lists of the castle's contents survive, including inventories from 1510, 1571, 1580, 1644, and 1668. These list guns and furniture and name many locations in the castle. There is also a list of cannon transported by John Drummond of Milnab to Dumbarton in 1536. In 1510 St Patricks chapel contained an old parchment mass book, a pewter chalice, and liturgical cloths. The hall had four tables and next to that was a chalmer of Dess, a 'solar' in English terms with a bed. The Wallace tower was protected with an iron yett and draw bar, there were bedchambers within and a bell at the head of the tower; the 'Wynde Hall' contained another bed.

In August 1536 George Stirling of Glorat took delivery from John Drummond the king's Master Wright of four great guns and six falcons on carriages with wheels, thirty three bronze hagbut hand-guns and four iron culverins, with ammunition and powder and ramrods for the big guns.

In 1571 amongst the cannon and guns there was a "gross culverin", two small "batteris", and a French "moyen" mounted for use on the walls. Another moyen was suitable for action in the field. There were two Brittany-made falcons on the walls, a quarter falcon and a "double barse". Provisions included eleven hogshead of biscuit. Some of the guns were subsequently taken to besiege Edinburgh Castle during the Marian civil war.

The document compiled in 1580 was "the inventar of the munitioun and uther insicht geir underwrittin left in the castell of Dumbertane be Johnne Conninghame of Drumquhassill and deliverit be the said Johnne to William Stewart of Cabirston in name and behalf of ane noble and potent lord Esme erll of Lennox lord Darnley and Obeigny on the 27 August 1580". There were six large cannon. The bed in the chamber of dais was now described as 'ane stand bed of eistland tymmar with ruf and pannell of the same', a bed made from imported Baltic oak.

By 1644, when John Sempill was made keeper the 'Chamber of deisse' still contained a bed with a chamber pot and truckle bed for a servant, but it also contained armaments. There were twelve ram-rods, and three worms' - screws for unloading guns, three hagbuts and an iron flail. The hall contained twelve broken pikes, four without their iron blades. The contents of the armoury included thirty-three corslets, 105 helmets, and 43 swords.

In 1668 the Governor Francis Montgomerie of Giffin recorded that the first floor of a lodging called the 'new chamber' contained 'a quantity of old rusty guns and sword, so rusted broke and spoiled that they can never serve for any use, above the beds were 'insufficient' and in the top room there was spoiled matches. The windows of this new lodging were broken. Montgomerie was worried about the water-supply from the loch and the 'laigh' low well.

Governors and Keepers

Governors

1292: Sir Nicolas de Seagrave
1296 : Sir Ingram de Umfraville
1296 : Alexander de Ledes

Lord Sir John Eustace de Maxwell II 6th Lord Caerlaverock
about 1285 – 17 October 1346	 

1303 : Sir John de Menteith
1333 : Sir Malcolm Fleming of Cumbernauld
1357 : Sir Robert Erskine
1377 : Sir John Danyelstoun
       Sir Robert Danyelstoun
1400 : Walter de Danyelstoun (later bishop of St Andrews)
1424 : Sir John Colquhoun, 10th of Luss
 John Cunningham, 11th Earl of Glencairn
 1546- 1562 James Hamilton, Duke of Chatellerault, 2nd Earl of Arran
 1562: Robert Anstruther
 1565: John Fleming, 5th Lord Fleming
 1620: John Stewart of Methven
 1633: Sir John Maxwell, 1st Baronet, of Pollok 
 1696: Francis Montgomerie
 1715: William Cunningham, 12th Earl of Glencairn
 1764: Archibald Montgomerie, 11th Earl of Eglinton
 1782: Sir Charles Grey
 1797: Gerard Lake, 1st Viscount Lake
 1807: William Loftus
 1810: Andrew John Drummond
 30 January 1817: Francis Dundas
 5 February 1824: George Harris, 1st Baron Harris
 22 May 1829: Thomas Graham, 1st Baron Lynedoch

Lieutenant-Governors

 1756: Charles Hubert Herriot
 Campbell Edmonstone
 1796: Hay Ferrier
 1799: Samuel Graham
 Ferrier again?
 15 April 1824: John Vincent

Keepers
 1425 Sir John Colquhoun, 10th of Luss
1497 Sir John Striveling (Stirling) of Craigbernard 
1510 William Striveling (Stirling) 1st of Glorat – murdered on Good Friday 1534)
1534 George Striveling (Stirling) 2nd of Glorat
 1644: John Semple
 22 December 1927: Sir George Murray Home Stirling, 9th Baronet of Glorat
 4 July 1949: Alexander Patrick Drummond Telfer-Smollett
 9 May 1955: Sir Angus Edward Malise Bontine Cunninghame Graham
 12 June 1981: Alastair Stevenson Pearson
 10 September 1996: Donald David Graeme Hardie

The castle today 

Today all visible traces of the Dark-Age Alt Clut, its buildings and defences, have gone. Not much survives from the medieval castle: the 14th-century Portcullis Arch, the foundations of the Wallace Tower, and what may be the foundations of the White Tower. There is a 16th-century guard house, which includes a face which according to legend is "Fause Menteith", who betrayed William Wallace.

Most of the existing structures were built in the 18th century, including the Governor's House, built for John Kennedy, 8th Earl of Cassilis, and fortifications which demonstrate the struggle by military engineers to adapt an intractable site to contemporary defensive needs. The castle is open on a daily basis during the summer season and Saturday-Wednesday in the winter. There are 557 steps to the summit of the White Tower Crag, which has a good view of the area.

Dumbarton Rock is in state ownership and is legally protected by the Scottish Government as a Scheduled Ancient Monument.

Geodesy 
Up to 1919 Dumbarton Rock was the origin (meridian) of the 6 inch and 1:2500 Ordnance Survey maps for Dumbartonshire. After that the maps for Dumbartonshire were drawn according to the meridian of Lanark Church Spire in Lanarkshire.

In popular culture
In 1803 Dorothy and William Wordsworth visited the castle and were told that a ruin on the top of the highest eminence had been a windmill and were shown a trout, boxed up in a well close by to the guard room, that had been there for thirty years. The castle features in The Scottish Chiefs.

References

Further reading
 John Irving, Dumbarton Castle, Its Place in the History of Scotland, (Dumbarton 1917)
 The correspondence of Robert Bowes, of Aske, esquire, the ambassador of Queen Elizabeth in the court of Scotland, Surtees Society (London 1842)
 Dorothy Wordsworth (1894). Recollections of a Tour Made in Scotland AD 1803. Edinburgh : David Douglas.

External links
 Historic Environment Scotland: Visitor guide
 Clyde Waterfront Heritage, Dumbarton Castle  
 www.rampantscotland.com Dumbarton Castle
 Electric Scotland on the castle
 Map of Geoffrey of Monmouth's Britain, including Dumbarton, Siân Echard, University of British Columbia
 Engraving of Dumbarton Castle from the West in 1693 by John Slezer at National Library of Scotland

Castles in West Dunbartonshire
Category A listed buildings in West Dunbartonshire
Archaeological sites in West Dunbartonshire
Listed castles in Scotland
Wars of Scottish Independence
Dumbarton
Viking Age sites in Scotland
Locations associated with Arthurian legend
Scheduled Ancient Monuments in West Dunbartonshire
Sites of Special Scientific Interest in Dumbarton and North Glasgow